Thai Leagues may refer to:

 Thai League 1
 Thai League 2
 Thai League 3
 Thailand Semi-Pro League
 Thailand Amateur League
 Thai League 4 (defunct)